Park Joo-hee is a South Korean actress. She is known for her roles in dramas such as Tomorrow, with You, The Ghost Detective, My Golden Life, Watcher and Happiness. She also appeared in movies Set Me Free, Illang: The Wolf Brigade and High Society.

Filmography

Television series

Film

Awards and nominations

References

External Links 
 
 

1987 births
Living people
21st-century South Korean actresses
South Korean television actresses
South Korean film actresses